Stephen Murphy, born Sydney, Australia, May 26, 1942, is a lute maker located in Southern France at Mollans-sur-Ouvèze.

He makes lutes, archlutes, theorbos, Renaissance and Baroque guitars and vihuelas.

Since 1972 he has built over 400 instruments based on originals from the 16th. and 17th century.

External links 
 Stephen Murphy lutemaker website

French luthiers
Lute makers
1942 births
Living people
Australian emigrants to France
People from Sydney